Lophacme is a genus of African plants in the grass family.

 Species
 Lophacme digitata Stapf - Zambia, Zimbabwe, Angola, Free State, Limpopo, Gauteng, Mpumalanga, Free State, KwaZulu-Natal
 Lophacme parva Renvoize & Clayton - Zambia

 formerly included
see Enteropogon 
 Lophacme incompleta - Enteropogon dolichostachyus

References

External links
 Grassbase - The World Online Grass Flora

Chloridoideae
Poaceae genera
Flora of Africa